Sergei Sergeyevich Chernousov (born 18 March 1993) is a former Russian football midfielder.

Club career
He made his debut in the Russian Football National League for FC Gazovik Orenburg on 23 November 2013 in a game against FC Dynamo Saint Petersburg.

References

External links
 Career summary by sportbox.ru

1993 births
Living people
Russian footballers
FC Orenburg players
Association football midfielders
FC Nosta Novotroitsk players